Pál Ványa (13 January 1904 – 5 October 1967) was a Hungarian ski jumper. He competed in the individual event at the 1948 Winter Olympics.

References

1904 births
1967 deaths
Hungarian male ski jumpers
Olympic ski jumpers of Hungary
Ski jumpers at the 1948 Winter Olympics
People from Veľký Krtíš District
Sportspeople from the Banská Bystrica Region
20th-century Hungarian people